This is a list of public holidays in Kosovo.

Annotations

See also
 Public holidays in Yugoslavia

References

Kosovo
Kosovan culture
Society of Kosovo
Holidays
Kosovo